Aidan Dorgan (born 1973) is an Irish Gaelic football manager and former player who played for Mid Cork club Grenagh. He played for the Cork senior football team for five years, during which time he usually lined out in the forwards.

Honours

Cork
Munster Senior Football Championship (1): 1999
National Football League (1): 1998-99

References

1973 births
Living people
Grenagh Gaelic footballers
Cork inter-county Gaelic footballers
Gaelic football managers